The Arab States Broadcasting Union (ASBU) is an Arab joint-action institution related to the League of Arab States and the Pan-Arab Association of Public Service and Commercial Broadcasters. Founded in February 1969 in Khartoum, ASBU is a professional organization with the objective of strengthening ties and promoting cooperation among broadcasters in the Arab States for better production and content development. ASBU provides important services such as engineering and consulting services, radio and television exchange of news, programming and sports, as well as radio and TV training. It also strives to acquire broadcasting rights at preferential rates for a number of competitions and sports events to the benefit of its members, as well as to ensure the appropriate broadcasting coverage of such events.

Its headquarters are in the Tunisian city of Tunis.

Members

Active Members
 Abu Dhabi Media
 Bahrain Radio and Television Corporation
 Broadcasting Services of the Kingdom of Saudi Arabia
 Entreprise nationale de Radiodiffusion sonore (Algeria)
 Entreprise nationale de télévision (Algeria)
 ERTU (Egypt)
 Iraqi Media Network (Iraq)
 Jordan Radio and Television Corporation
 Kuwait Television
 Libyan Jamahiriya Broadcasting Corporation
 Palestinian Broadcasting Corporation 
 Qatar Media Corporation
 Radio Television of Djibouti
 Radio Tunisienne (Tunisia)
 Société Nationale de Radiodiffusion et de Télévision (Morocco)
 Somali Radio and Television
 Radio Mogadishu
 Somali National Television
 Sudanese Radio and Television Corporation
 Sultanate of Oman Television
 Syrian Radio and TV Organization
 Télé Liban (Lebanon)
 Télévision Tunisienne (Tunisia)
 TV de Mauritanie (Mauritania)
 Yemen General Radio & TV Corporation
 Yemen Radio
 Yemen TV

Participating Members 
 Al-Manar - Al-Nour (Hezbollah via Lebanese Communication Group)
 Al-Watan (Kuwait)
 JeemTV (beIN Media Group)
 Middle East Broadcasting Center
 OSN
 Rotana Media Group
 beIN Sports (beIN Media Group)

Associate Members
 Addounia TV (Syria)
 Alhurra (Middle East Broadcasting Networks)
 Canal France International
 France 24 (France Médias Monde)
 Hannibal-TV (Tunisia)
 Nessma TV (Tunisia)
 Pakistan Television Corporation
 Radio Netherlands Worldwide
 RAI (Italy)
 RT (Russia)
 RTVE (Spain)
 Sky News Arabia
 Zayed Radio for Holy Quran (United Arab Emirates)

Former Members
 Établissement de la Radiodiffusion-Télévision Tunisienne
 Libyan Jamahiriya Broadcasting Corporation (Closed in 2011)

See also
 Arab League

References

External links
  
 Arab league

1969 establishments in Sudan
Organizations established in 1969
Public broadcasting
Broadcasting Union